Andrei Zaharov (born October 10, 1975) is a Moldovan former swimmer, who specialized in freestyle and individual medley events. Zaharov represented Moldova at four Olympics (1996 in Atlanta, 2000 in Sydney, 2004 in Athens, and 2008 in Beijing).

Zaharov also became one of the five swimmers to represent Moldova at his nation's first Olympics in Atlanta, since it gained independence from the former Soviet Union in 1991. He competed for the 200 m and 400 m freestyle events, where he set a national record and produced fair results in each event. Zaharov continued his quest at the Olympics, when he qualified for the 200 m individual medley, placing forty-seventh in Sydney, and thirty-ninth in Athens. For his fourth Olympics in Beijing, Zaharov decided to compete for the men's 200 m freestyle event, through a wild card place. He swam in the second heat of the event, finishing only in last place and fifty-sixth overall, with a time of 1:58.62.

References

External links
NBC Olympics Profile

Moldovan male medley swimmers
Living people
Olympic swimmers of Moldova
Swimmers at the 1996 Summer Olympics
Swimmers at the 2000 Summer Olympics
Swimmers at the 2004 Summer Olympics
Swimmers at the 2008 Summer Olympics
Moldovan male freestyle swimmers
Sportspeople from Chișinău
1975 births